Snooker (pronounced) is a cue sport played on a rectangular table covered with a green cloth called baize, with six pockets, one at each corner and one in the middle of each long side. First played by British Army officers stationed in India in the second half of the 19th century, the game is played with twenty-two balls, comprising a white , fifteen red balls, and six other balls—a yellow, green, brown, blue, pink, and black—collectively called the colours. An individual  of snooker is won by the player who has scored the most points. A snooker  ends when a player reaches a predetermined number of frames.

Snooker gained its identity in 1875 when army officer Sir Neville Chamberlain, stationed in Ootacamund, Madras, and Jabalpur, devised a set of rules that combined black pool and pyramids. The word snooker was a well-established derogatory term used to describe inexperienced or first-year military personnel. In the early 20th century, snooker was predominantly played in the United Kingdom where it was considered a "gentleman's sport" until the early 1960s, before growing in popularity as a national pastime and eventually spreading overseas. The standard rules of the game were first established in 1919 when the Billiards Association and Control Club was formed. As a professional sport, snooker is now governed by the World Professional Billiards and Snooker Association.

The World Snooker Championship first took place in 1927. Joe Davis, a key figure and pioneer in the early growth of the sport, won fifteen successive world championships between 1927 and 1946. The "modern era" of snooker began in 1969 after the broadcaster BBC commissioned the television series Pot Black, later airing daily coverage of the World Championship, which was first televised in 1978. Key figures in the game were Ray Reardon in the 1970s, Steve Davis in the 1980s, and Stephen Hendry in the 1990s, each winning the World Championship at least six times. Since 2000, Ronnie O'Sullivan has won the most world titles.

Top professional players compete in regular tournaments around the world, earning millions of pounds on the World Snooker Tour, a circuit of international events featuring competitors of many different nationalities. The World Championship, the UK Championship, and the Masters together make up the Triple Crown Series, considered by many players to be the most highly valued titles. Although the main professional tour is open to women, female players also compete on a separate women's tour organised by World Women's Snooker. Competitive snooker is also available to non-professional players, including seniors and people with disabilities. The popularity of snooker has led to the creation of many variations based on the standard game, but using different rules or equipment, including six-red snooker, the short-lived "snooker plus", and the more recent Snooker Shoot Out version.

History

Snooker originated in the second half of the 19th century. In the 1870s, billiards was popular among British Army officers stationed in Jubbulpore, India, and several variations of the game were devised during this time. A similar game, which originated at the Officers' Mess of the 11th Devonshire Regiment in 1875, combined the rules of two pool games: pyramid pool, played with fifteen red balls positioned in a triangle; and black pool, which involved the potting of designated balls. Snooker was further developed in 1882 when its first set of rules was finalised by British Army officer Sir Neville Chamberlain, who helped devise and popularise the game at Stone House in Ootacamund on a table built by Burroughes & Watts that had been brought to India by boat. The word snooker was, at the time, a slang term used in the British Army to describe new recruits and inexperienced military personnel; Chamberlain used it to deride the inferior performance of a young fellow officer at the table.

Snooker featured in an 1887 issue of the Sporting Life newspaper in England, which led to a growth in popularity. Chamberlain was revealed as the game's inventor, 63 years after the fact, in a letter to The Field magazine published on 19 March 1938. Snooker became increasingly popular across the Indian colonies of the British Raj, and in the United Kingdom, but it remained a game mainly for military officers and the gentry; many gentlemen's clubs that had a snooker table would not allow non-members inside to play. (Reflecting the game's aristocratic origins, the majority of tournaments on the professional circuit still require players to wear waistcoats and bow ties, although the necessity for this attire has been questioned.) To cater for the growing interest, smaller and more open snooker clubs were formed. The Billiards Association (formed 1885) and the Billiards Control Club (formed 1908) merged to form the Billiards Association and Control Club (BA&CC) and a new, standardised set of rules for snooker was first established in 1919. These rules are similar to the ones used today, although rules for a minimal point penalty was imposed later.

Played in 1926 and 1927, the first World Snooker Championship—then known as the Professional Championship of Snooker—was won by Joe Davis. A Women's Professional Snooker Championship (now the World Women's Snooker Championship) was created in 1934 for top female players. As a professional English billiards and snooker player himself, Davis raised the game from a recreational pastime to a professional sporting activity. Davis won all fifteen tournaments held until 1946, when he retired from the championships. However, snooker declined in popularity in the post-war era; the 1952 World Snooker Championship was contested by only two players and was replaced by the World Professional Match-play Championship, which was also discontinued in 1957. In an effort to boost popularity of snooker, Davis introduced a variation known as "snooker plus" in 1959, which added two extra colours, but this version of the game was short-lived. A world championship for top amateur players, now known as the IBSF World Snooker Championship, was founded in 1963, and the official world championship was revived on a challenge basis in 1964.

The BBC first launched its colour television service in July 1967. In 1969, David Attenborough, then the controller of BBC2, commissioned the snooker tournament television series Pot Black, primarily to showcase the potential of the BBC's new colour television service, as the green table and multi-coloured balls provided an ideal opportunity to demonstrate the advantages of the new broadcasting technology. The series became a ratings success and was, for a time, the second-most popular show on BBC2 behind Morecambe and Wise. In the same year, the 1969 World Snooker Championship reverted to a knockout tournament format, with eight players competing. Due to these developments, the year 1969 is taken to mark the beginning of snooker's modern era. The World Snooker Championship moved in 1977 to the Crucible Theatre in Sheffield, where it has been staged ever since, and the 1978 World Snooker Championship was the first to receive daily television coverage. Snooker quickly became a mainstream sport in the United Kingdom, Ireland, and much of the Commonwealth, and has remained consistently popular since the late 1970s, with most of the major tournaments being televised. In 1985, an estimated 18.5 million viewers stayed up until the early hours of the morning to watch the conclusion of the World Championship final between Dennis Taylor and Steve Davis, a record viewership in the UK for any broadcast on BBC Two or any broadcast after midnight.

As professional snooker grew as a mainstream sport, it became heavily dependent on tobacco advertising. Cigarette brand Embassy sponsored the World Snooker Championship for 30 consecutive years from 1976 to 2005, one of the longest-running deals in British sports sponsorship. In the early 2000s, a ban on tobacco advertising led to a reduction in the number of professional tournaments, which decreased from twenty-two events in 1999 to fifteen in 2003. The sport had become more popular in Asia with the emergence of players such as Ding Junhui and Marco Fu, and still received significant television coverage in the UK—the BBC dedicated 400 hours to snooker in 2007, compared to just 14 minutes 40 years earlier. However, the British public's interest in snooker had waned significantly by the late 2000s. Warning that the sport was "lurching into terminal crisis", The Guardian newspaper predicted in 2010 that snooker would cease to exist as a professional sport within ten years. In the same year, promoter Barry Hearn gained a controlling interest in the World Snooker Tour, pledging to revitalise the "moribund" professional game. 

Over the following decade, the number of professional tournaments increased, with 44 events held in the 2019–20 season. Snooker tournaments were adapted to make them more suitable for television audiences, with some tournaments being played over a shortened duration, or the Snooker Shoot Out, which is a timed, one- competition. The prize money for professional events increased, with the top players earning several million pounds over the course of their careers. However, lower-ranked professional players struggled to make a living from the sport, especially after paying tournament entry fees, travel, and other expenses. Players including 2005 world champion Shaun Murphy have claimed that a 128-player professional tour is financially unsustainable. During the COVID-19 pandemic, the professional tour was confined to events played within the United Kingdom and Ireland. In the 2022–23 season, only two professional ranking tournaments were played outside the UK, the European Masters in Fürth and the German Masters in Berlin, while lucrative Chinese events remained off the calendar. Stephen Maguire in 2023 criticised the World Snooker Tour and World Professional Billiards and Snooker Association, claiming that "the game is dying right in front of our eyes", and stating that some players ranked within the world's top 30 were seeking jobs outside the sport due to lack of earning potential from tournaments.

Snooker referees are an integral part of the sport, and some have become well-known personalities in their own right. Len Ganley, John Street, and John Williams together refereed 17 of the first 20 World Snooker finals held at the Crucible Theatre. Since 2000, non-British and female referees have become more prominent in the sport. Dutch referee Jan Verhaas became the first non-Briton to referee a World Championship final in 2003, while Michaela Tabb became the first woman to do so in 2009. Tabb was the only woman refereeing on the professional tour when she joined it in 2002, but tournaments now routinely feature female referees such as Desislava Bozhilova, Maike Kesseler, and Tatiana Woollaston.

Gameplay

Equipment

The playing surface is surrounded by small  along each side of the table. The table has six , one at each corner and one at the centre of each of the two longer side cushions. One drawback of using a full-size table is the amount of space required to accommodate it, which limits the locations where the game can easily be played. While pool tables are common to many pubs, snooker tends to be played either in private settings or in public snooker halls.

The nap affects the speed and trajectory of the balls, depending on the direction of the shot and whether any  is placed on the ball. A snooker ball set consists of twenty-two unmarked balls: fifteen , six , and one white cue ball. The six colours are one each of yellow, green, brown, blue, pink, and black,  although the brown and blue balls were not a part of the original rules. At the start of the game, the red balls are racked into a tightly packed equilateral triangle and the six colours are positioned at designated  on the table. The cue ball is placed inside the "D" ready for the  shot. The  of the cue must only make contact with the cue ball and is never used for striking any of the reds or colours directly.

A traditional snooker scoreboard resembles an abacus and records the  scored by each player for the current frame in units and twenties, as well as the frame scores. A simple scoring bead is sometimes used, called a "scoring string" or "scoring wire". Each segment of the string (bead) represents one point as the players can move one or several beads along the string.

Rules

Objective
A player wins a frame by scoring more points than their opponent. The players then take alternating  at playing shots, with the aim of  a red ball into a pocket and thereby scoring one point. At the end of each shot, the cue ball remains in the position where it has come to rest (unless it has entered a pocket, where it is returned to the "D") ready for the next shot. The player must then play away from that ball without moving it, or else the player will concede penalty points. When playing away from a touching ball, the player is not required to strike another object ball.

When a red ball enters a pocket, the striker must then pot a coloured ball (or "colour") of their choice. If successful, the value of the potted colour is added to the player's score, and the ball is returned to its designated spot on the table. (If a designated spot is unavailable, the colour is respotted on the spot of the next-highest valued colour; if no spots are available, the colour is respotted as close as possible to its own spot towards the top of the table.) The player must then pot another red ball followed by another colour. The process of alternately potting reds and colours continues until the striker fails to pot the desired object ball or commits a foul—at which point the opponent comes to the table to start the next turn—or when there are no red balls remaining. Points accumulated by potting successive object balls are called a "" (see Scoring below). The cue ball may contact an object ball directly or it can be made to bounce off one or more cushions before hitting the required object ball.

The game continues until every red ball has been potted and only the six colours and the cue ball are left on the table. The colours must next be potted in the ascending order of their values, from lowest to highest, i.e.  first (worth two points), then  (three points),  (four points),  (five points),  (six points), and finally  (seven points); each colour remains in the pocket after being potted. When the final ball is potted, the player with the most points wins the frame. If there are not enough points remaining on the table for a player to win the frame, that player may offer to concede the frame while at the table (but not while their opponent is still at the table); a frame concession is a common occurrence in professional snooker. Players will often play on even when there are not enough points available for them to win, hoping to force their opponent into playing foul shots by laying . These are shots that are designed to make playing a legal shot harder, such as leaving another ball between the cue ball and the object ball.

If the scores are equal when all of the object balls have been potted, the black is used as a tiebreaker. In this situation, called a "", the black ball is returned to its designated spot and the cue ball is played , meaning that it may be placed anywhere on or within the lines of the "D" to start the tiebreak. The referee then tosses a coin and the winner of the toss decides who takes the first strike. The game continues until one of the players either pots the black ball to win the frame, or commits a foul (losing the frame).

Professional and competitive amateur matches are officiated by a referee, who is charged with ensuring the proper conduct of players and making decisions "in the interests of fair play". The responsibilities of the referee include announcing the points scored during a break, determining when a foul has been committed and awarding penalty points and free balls accordingly, replacing colours onto their designated spots after they are potted, restoring the balls to their previous positions after the "miss" rule has been invoked (see Scoring), and cleaning the cue ball or any object ball upon request by the striker. Another duty of the referee is to recognise and declare a stalemate when neither player is able to make any progress in the frame. If both players agree, the balls are returned to their starting positions and the frame is restarted (known as a ""), with the same player taking the break-off shot as before. Professional players usually play the game in a sporting manner, declaring fouls they have committed which the referee has not noticed, acknowledging good shots from their opponent, and holding up a hand to apologise for a fortunate shot, known as a "fluke".

Scoring

Points in snooker are gained from potting the object balls in the correct sequence. The total number of consecutive points (excluding fouls) that a player amasses during one  to the table is known as a "break". A player could achieve a break of 15, for example, by first potting a red followed by a black, then another red followed by a pink, before failing to pot the next red. Breaks of 100 points or more are referred to as a century break, and are recorded over the career of a professional player. A maximum break in snooker is achieved by potting all reds with blacks, then potting all six colours, yielding 147 points; this is often known as a "147" or a "maximum". , there have been 178 officially confirmed maximum breaks achieved in professional competition.

Penalty points are awarded to a player when a foul is committed by the opponent. A foul can occur for various reasons, such as sending the cue ball into a pocket, or failing to hit the object ball. The latter is a common foul committed when a player fails to escape from a "", where the previous player has left the cue ball positioned such that no legal ball can be struck directly in a straight line without being wholly or partially obstructed by an illegal ball. Fouls incur a minimum of four penalty points unless a higher-value object ball is involved in the foul, up to a maximum of seven penalty points where the black ball is concerned. When a foul is committed, the offender's turn ends and the referee announces the penalty. All points scored in the break before the foul was committed are awarded to the striker, but no points are scored for any ball pocketed during the foul shot.

If dissatisfied with the position left after a foul, the next player may nominate the opponent who committed the foul to play again from where the balls have come to rest. If the referee has also called a "miss"—meaning that the referee has deemed the opponent not to have made their best possible attempt to hit the object ball—the player has the option of having the balls replaced to their original positions and forcing the opponent to play the shot again. If, after a foul, the next player cannot cleanly strike both sides of the object ball, the referee may call a free ball, allowing the player to nominate any other ball in place of the object ball they might normally have played. If a player is awarded a free ball with all 15 red balls still in play, they can potentially make a break exceeding 147, with the highest possible being a 155 break, achieved by nominating the free ball as an extra red, then potting the black as the additional colour after potting the free-ball red, followed by the 15 reds with blacks, and finally the colours. Jamie Cope was the first player to achieve a verified 155 break during a practice frame in 2005, with other players such as Alex Higgins claiming to have made a similar break.

One  of snooker is called a "frame". A snooker  generally consists of a predetermined number of frames. Most matches in current professional tournaments are played as the best of 7, 9, or 11 frames, with finals usually the best of 17 or 19 frames. The World Championship uses a longer format, with matches ranging from the best of 19 frames in the first round to best of 35 for the final, which is played over four  of play held over two days. Some early world finals had much longer matches, such as the 1947 World Snooker Championship, which was played over the best of 145 frames.

Governance and tournaments

Professional
Professional snooker players compete on the World Snooker Tour, which is a circuit of world ranking tournaments and invitational events held throughout the snooker season. All competitions are open to professional players who have qualified for the tour, and selected amateur players, but most events include a separate qualification stage. Players can qualify for the tour by virtue of their position in the world rankings from prior seasons, by winning continental championships, or through the Challenge Tour or Q School events. Players on the World Snooker Tour generally gain a two-year "tour card" for participation in the events. Beginning in the 2014–15 season, some players have also received invitational tour cards in recognition of their outstanding contributions to the sport; these cards are issued at the discretion of the World Snooker Board, and have been awarded to players including Steve Davis, James Wattana, Jimmy White, and Stephen Hendry. Some additional secondary tours have been contested over the years. A two-tier structure was adopted for the 1997–98 snooker season; comprising six tournaments known as the WPBSA Minor Tour was open to all professionals, but only ran for one season. A similar secondary UK Tour was first played from the 1997–98 season, which was renamed the Challenge Tour in 2000, Players Tour Championship in 2010 and returned as the Challenge Tour in 2018.

The global governing body for professional snooker is the World Professional Billiards and Snooker Association (WPBSA), founded as the Professional Billiard Players' Association. The WPBSA owns and publishes the official rules of snooker, and has overall responsibility for policy-making in the professional sport of snooker. World Snooker Ltd responsible for the professional tour which is owned by both the WPBSA and Matchroom Sport.

World rankings

Every player on the World Snooker Tour is assigned a position on the WPBSA's official world ranking list, which is used to determine the seedings and the level of qualification each player requires for the tournaments on the professional circuit. The current world rankings are determined using a two-year rolling points system, where points are allocated to the players according to the prize money earned at designated tournaments. This "rolling" list is maintained and updated throughout the season, with points from tournaments played in the current season replacing points earned from the corresponding tournaments of two seasons ago. Additionally, "one-year" and "two-year" ranking lists are compiled at the end of every season, after the World Championship; these year-end lists are used for pre-qualification at certain tournaments and for tour-card guarantees.

The top 16 players in the world ranking list, generally regarded as the "elite" of the professional snooker circuit, are not required to pre-qualify for some of the tournaments, such as the Shanghai Masters, the Masters and the World Snooker Championship. Certain other events, such as those in the Players Series, use the one-year ranking list to qualify; these use the results of the current season to denote participants. As of the 2020–21 season, there are 128 places available on the World Snooker Tour, with players either in the top 64 on the official ranking list, or finishing as one of the top eight prize money earners during the most recent season, guaranteed a tour place for the next season, this being assessed after the World Championship.

Tournaments

The oldest current professional snooker tournament is the World Snooker Championship, which has taken place as an annual event most years since 1927. Hosted since 1977 at the Crucible Theatre in Sheffield, England, the championship was sponsored by tobacco company Embassy from 1976 to 2005, and has since been sponsored by various betting companies after the introduction of an EU-wide ban on advertising tobacco products. The Triple Crown tournaments are televised in the UK by the BBC, while most other tournaments are broadcast on the Eurosport network, or ITV Sport, as well as numerous other broadcasters internationally.

The World Championship is the most highly valued title in professional snooker, both in terms of financial reward (the tournament has carried a £500,000 winner's prize since 2019), ranking points, and prestige. The UK Championship, held annually since 1977, is considered to be the second most important ranking tournament, after the World Championship. These two events, and the annual non-ranking Masters tournament, make up the Triple Crown Series; being some of the oldest competitions on the professional circuit, the Triple Crown events are valued by many players as the most prestigious. Only eleven players have won all three Triple Crown events, as of 2022.

Snooker has faced criticism for matches taking too long. In response, Matchroom Sport chairman Barry Hearn introduced a series of timed tournaments. The shot-timed Premier League Snooker was held between 1987 and 2012, with seven players invited to compete at regular United Kingdom venues, is televised on Sky Sports. Players had twenty-five seconds to take each shot, with five time-outs per player per match. Although some success was achieved with this format, it did not receive the same amount of press attention or status as the regular ranking tournaments. This event has been taken out of the tour since 2013, when the Champion of Champions was established. The event saw players qualify by virtue of winning other events in the season, with 16 champions competing.

In 2015, the WPBSA submitted an unsuccessful bid for snooker to be played at the 2020 Summer Olympics in Tokyo, Japan. Another bid has been put forward for the 2024 Summer Olympics through the World Snooker Federation, founded in 2017. A trial for the format for cue sports to be played at the 2024 games was put forward at the 2019 World Team Trophy, also featuring nine-ball and carom billiards. Snooker has been contested at the World Games since 2001, and was included as an event at the 2019 African Games.

Amateur
Non-professional snooker (including youth competition) is governed by the International Billiards and Snooker Federation (IBSF). Events held specifically for seniors are handled by the WPBSA under the World Seniors Tour. World Disability Billiards and Snooker (WDBS) is a WPBSA subsidiary that organises events and playing aids in snooker and other cue sports for people with disabilities. Snooker is a mixed gender sport that affords men and women the same opportunities to progress at all levels of the game. While the main professional tour is open to female players, there is also a separate women's tour organised by World Women's Snooker (formerly the World Ladies Billiards and Snooker Association) that encourages female players to participate in the sport. The winner of the World Women's Snooker Championship now receives a two-year tour card to the main professional tour.

The highest competition in the amateur sport is the IBSF World Snooker Championship, while the highest level of the senior sport is the World Seniors Championship. On the women's tour, the leading tournament is the World Women's Snooker Championship. The reigning champion is Reanne Evans who has held the women's world title twelve times since first winning the championship in 2005. Evans has also participated on the World Snooker Tour and has taken part in the qualifying rounds of the main world championship on five occasions, reaching the second round in 2017. The most prestigious amateur event in England is the English Amateur Championship; first held in 1916, this is the oldest snooker competition still being played in the world.

Criticism
Several players, such as Ronnie O'Sullivan, Mark Allen and Steve Davis, have claimed that there are too many tournaments during the season and that they think players risk burnout. In 2012, O'Sullivan played fewer tournaments to spend more time with his children, and ended the 2012–13 season ranked 19th in the world; he played only one tournament in 2013, the World Championship, which he won. He has suggested that a "breakaway tour" with fewer events would be beneficial to the sport, but as of 2018 no such tour has been organised.

Some leagues have allowed clubs to exclude female players from tournaments. A committee member of the Keighley league defended allowing such teams in the league as necessity: "If we lose two of these clubs [with the men-only policies] we would lose four teams and we can't afford to lose four teams otherwise we would have no league." A World Women's Snooker spokesperson commented, "It is disappointing and unacceptable that in 2019 that  players such as Rebecca Kenna have been the victim of antiquated discriminatory practices." The All-Party Parliamentary Group for Snooker said, "The group believes that being prevented from playing in a club because of gender is archaic."

Important players

After the creation of the World Snooker Championship, snooker overcame billiards as the most popular cue sport in the United Kingdom. Joe Davis was world champion for twenty years, retiring unbeaten from the event after claiming his fifteenth world title in 1946 when the tournament was reinstated after the Second World War. He was only beaten on level terms by his brother Fred Davis, all coming after his retirement from the game. He did lose matches in handicapped tournaments, but on level terms these defeats were the only losses of his entire career.

By 1947, Fred Davis was deemed ready by his brother to become world champion, but lost the world final to Walter Donaldson. Fred Davis and Donaldson would contest the next four finals. After the abandonment of the World Championship in 1953, with the 1952 event boycotted by British professionals, the World Professional Match-play Championship became the unofficial world championship. Fred Davis won the tournament every year from 1952 to 1956, but did not enter the 1957 event. John Pulman won the 1957 event and was the most successful player of the 1960s, won the event seven times between April 1964 and March 1968 when the World Championship was contested on a challenge basis. This winning streak ended when the tournament reverted to a knockout format in 1969. Ray Reardon was the dominant force in the 1970s, winning six world titles (1970, 1973–1976, and 1978), and John Spencer won three (1969, 1971 and 1977).

Steve Davis (no relation to Joe or Fred) won his first World Championship in 1981, becoming the 11th world champion since 1927. He won six world titles (1981, 1983, 1984, and 1987–1989) and competed in the most-watched snooker match, the 1985 World Snooker Championship final, which he lost to Dennis Taylor. Stephen Hendry became the 14th world champion in 1990, aged 21 years and 106 days; he is the youngest player ever to have lifted the world title. Hendry dominated the sport through the 1990s, winning the World Championship seven times (1990, 1992–1996, and 1999).

Ronnie O'Sullivan has won the most world titles since 2000, having done so on seven occasions (2001, 2004, 2008, 2012, 2013, 2020 and 2022), while John Higgins and Selby have both won four times (Higgins in 1998, 2007, 2009, and 2011; Selby in 2014, 2016, 2017, and 2021), and Mark Williams three times (2000, 2003, and 2018). O'Sullivan is the only player to have made 1,000 career century breaks, and holds the record for the most maximum breaks compiled in professional competition, having achieved his 15th in October 2018. O'Sullivan also holds the record for the most ranking titles (39) and most Triple Crown titles (21) achieved in the sport.

Variants
Some versions of snooker, such as six-red or ten-red snooker, are played with almost identical rules but with fewer object balls, reducing the time taken to play each frame. The Six-red World Championship, contested annually in Bangkok, Thailand, has been a regular fixture on the World Snooker Tour since 2012. The ten-red game has had a World Women's 10-Red Championship held annually in Leeds, England, from 2017 to 2019.

Geographic variations exist in the United States and Brazil, while speed versions of the standard game have been developed in the United Kingdom. American snooker is an amateur version of the game played almost exclusively in the United States. With simplified rules and generally played on smaller tables, this variant dates back to 1925. Sinuca brasileira (or "Brazilian snooker") is a variant of snooker played exclusively in Brazil, with fully divergent rules from the standard game, and using only one red ball instead of fifteen. At the start of the game, the single red is positioned halfway between the pink ball and the side cushion and the break-off shot cannot be used to pot the red or place the opponent in a snooker. The Snooker Shoot Out is a variant snooker tournament, first staged in 1990, featuring single-frame matches for an accelerated format. The idea was resurrected in 2011 with a modified version that was added to the professional tour in the 2010–11 season and upgraded to a ranking event in 2017.

Other games were designed with an increased number of object balls in play. One example is "snooker plus", which included two additional colours: an orange ball worth eight points positioned between pink and blue, and a purple ball worth 10 points positioned between brown and blue, increasing the maximum possible break to 210. Introduced at the 1959 News of the World Snooker Plus Tournament, this variant failed to gain popularity and is no longer played. Power Snooker was a short-lived cue sport based on aspects of snooker and pool, which was first played competitively as the 2010 Power Snooker Masters Trophy and again in 2011, but the format failed to gain widespread appeal and was discontinued. Using nine red balls racked in a diamond-shaped pack at the start of the game, the matches were limited to a fixed game-play period of 30 minutes. Tenball was a snooker variant designed specifically for the television show of the same name, presented by Phillip Schofield, which lasted for one series. A yellow and black ball worth ten points was added between the blue and pink, and the game had a slightly revised set of rules. Snookerpool is a variant of snooker that is played with traditional snooker balls on an American pool table with the larger pockets (11ft x 5.5ft).

See also

Notes

References

Bibliography

External links

 World Snooker Limited
 World Professional Billiards & Snooker Association
 International Billiards & Snooker Federation

 
Individual sports
Cue sports
Indoor sports
Pub games
Sports originating in India
Sports originating in South Asia
Articles containing video clips